Dimitry Muravyev (born 2 November 1979 in Kazakhstan) is a former professional road bicycle racer from Kazakhstan. He turned professional in 2002 and has ridden internationally since then, although his primary victories have been the Kazakhstan national road race (2002) and the Kazakhstan national time trial (three times, 2003–2005).

In 2007, he joined the newly formed Kazakh team  on the UCI ProTour, where he managed to place 8th in the 2007 Tour of Flanders and was a member of the winning team in the 2009 Tour de France. Muravyev later rejoined  for the 2012 season.

Career achievements

Major results

2002
1st National Road Race Championships
2003
1st National Time Trial Championships
1st Overall Ruban Granitier Breton
1st Prologue, Stages 4 & 6
1st Stage 1 Vuelta Ciclista a Navarra
Tour de Pyrénées
1st Stages 5 & 6
2nd Overall Tour de Normandie
2004
1st National Time Trial Championships
2005
1st National Time Trial Championships
2006
2nd GP de Villers Cotterêts
2007
8th Tour of Flanders
2009
1st Stage 4 (TTT) Tour de France
2011
2nd Route Adélie de Vitré
7th Overall Three Days of De Panne
2012
2nd Druivenkoers - Overijse

Grand Tour general classification results timeline

References

External links 

Team Astana profile

Kazakhstani male cyclists
1979 births
Living people
Asian Games medalists in cycling
Cyclists at the 1998 Asian Games
Cyclists at the 2002 Asian Games
Medalists at the 1998 Asian Games
Medalists at the 2002 Asian Games
Asian Games silver medalists for Kazakhstan
Asian Games bronze medalists for Kazakhstan
21st-century Kazakhstani people